Sanchari Theatre (Kannada: ಸಂಚಾರಿ ಥಿಯೇಟರ್) is a cultural organization located in Bengaluru, Karnataka, India. Sanchari Theatre is a drama troupe which is dedicated to the growth of drama. “Sanchari” is one of the Bhavas. Bhava or to emote is the ‘becoming’. Sanchari Bhavas are those always crossing feelings which are ancillary to a permanent mood. Thus the name Sanchari Theatre is fabricated. Sanchari is the brainchild of acclaimed dramatists N. Mangala, Rangayana Raghu and Gajanana T Naik. Mangala and Rangayana Raghu were resident actors of Rangayana before starting Sanchari Theatre. Sanchari produced plays that included Kannada writers and Kannada translations of plays written by William Shakespeare and other foreign writers.

History
Sanchari Theatre was established in the year 2004 for the promotion of stage crafts and dramas. Since then continuously knitted and performed number of dramas. N. Mangala and Gajanana T Naik looks after daily activities of Sanchari Theatre. Troupe has more than 50 actors. Sanchari Theatre performed its dramas in various places across India. Sanchari Theatre conducts annual theatre workshops for interested candidates. Sanchari also conducts in-house and residential workshops for children in the memory of B. V. Karanth and Prema Karanth. Different kinds of workshops are conducted based on age groups. To name them: PoorvaRanga, AdiRanga, BalaRanga and ShishuRanga. As part of these workshops, number of plays have resulted. Some of the visiting faculty to Sanchari Theatre include Prasanna, Sihi Kahi Chandru, Arun Sagar and Rangayana Raghu. In 2014, the institution celebrated its 10th anniversary as “Sanchari Sadagara” by performing 10 plays in 10 days. Sanchari celebrated 15th anniversary on 3 August 2020 by performing a play per month throughout the year and also came up with an experiment of publishing storytelling videos in social media.

Dramas Performed by Sanchari Theatre
To list some of the dramas performed by Sanchari Theatre...

 Urmila
 Arahanta
 Kamalamani Kamidi Kalyana
 Kailasam Keechaka
 Dhareyolagina Rajakarana
 Narigaligeke Kodilla
 Pinocchio
 Vanity Bag
 Sridevi Mahathme
 No Presents Please
 Venicina Vyapara
 Nidranagari
 Bhagavadajukeeya
 Halliyura Hammeera
 Maama Moshi
 Mudi Dore mathu moovaru makkalu
 Giddu Tailor Chaddi Specialist
 Ogatina Raani
 Ghama Ghama Bhavana.
 Rangajangamana Sthavara
 Clean And Clear, Paayakhane
and many more......

Achievements
 Sanchari actor Sanchari Vijay won the Best Actor 2014 National Award for his acting in the film Naanu Avanalla...Avalu.
 Sanchari Theatre contributed many actors to Theatre, film industry and TV.
 Sanchari Theatre continuously engaged in special experiments in theatre.

External links
 Official Website of Sanchari Theatre

References

See also
 B. V. Karanth
 Rangayana Raghu
 Sanchari Vijay

Theatrical organisations in India